In four-dimensional Euclidean geometry, the rectified 24-cell honeycomb is a uniform space-filling honeycomb. It is constructed by a rectification of the regular 24-cell honeycomb, containing tesseract and rectified 24-cell cells.

Alternate names 
 Rectified icositetrachoric tetracomb
 Rectified icositetrachoric honeycomb
 Cantellated 16-cell honeycomb
 Bicantellated tesseractic honeycomb

Symmetry constructions 

There are five different symmetry constructions of this tessellation. Each symmetry can be represented by different arrangements of colored rectified 24-cell and tesseract facets. The tetrahedral prism vertex figure contains 4 rectified 24-cells capped by two opposite tesseracts.

See also 
Regular and uniform honeycombs in 4-space:
Tesseractic honeycomb
16-cell honeycomb
24-cell honeycomb
Truncated 24-cell honeycomb
Snub 24-cell honeycomb
 5-cell honeycomb
 Truncated 5-cell honeycomb
 Omnitruncated 5-cell honeycomb

References 
 Coxeter, H.S.M. Regular Polytopes, (3rd edition, 1973), Dover edition,  p. 296, Table II: Regular honeycombs
 Kaleidoscopes: Selected Writings of H. S. M. Coxeter, edited by F. Arthur Sherk, Peter McMullen, Anthony C. Thompson, Asia Ivic Weiss, Wiley-Interscience Publication, 1995,  
 (Paper 24) H.S.M. Coxeter, Regular and Semi-Regular Polytopes III, [Math. Zeit. 200 (1988) 3-45]
 George Olshevsky, Uniform Panoploid Tetracombs, Manuscript (2006) (Complete list of 11 convex uniform tilings, 28 convex uniform honeycombs, and 143 convex uniform tetracombs) Model 93
 , o3o3o4x3o, o4x3o3x4o - ricot - O93

5-polytopes
Honeycombs (geometry)